The 2022 Malaysia Cricket World Cup Challenge League A was the third round of matches in Group A of the 2019–2022 ICC Cricket World Cup Challenge League, a cricket tournament which formed part of the qualification pathway to the 2023 Cricket World Cup. In October 2019, the International Cricket Council (ICC) confirmed that the Malaysia Cricket Association would host the tournament, with the series scheduled to take place between 16 and 26 March 2020. All of the matches had List A status.

In March 2020, the ICC confirmed that the tournament had been postponed due to the COVID-19 pandemic, with the aim of playing it later in the year. Prior to the March postponement, Canada, Denmark and Vanuatu had named their squads for the tournament. On 24 March 2020, an ICC media release stated that the tournament would be scheduled to take place from 30 September to 10 October 2020. However, on 25 August 2020, the ICC confirmed that the tournament had been postponed due to the pandemic. In April 2021, the ICC announced that the tournament would be played during November and December 2021. Eventually the series began in December 2022, with Canada in a strong position to progress.

On 6 December 2022, Canada defeated Singapore by 187 runs to secure first place in Challenge League A and a place in the 2023 ICC Cricket World Cup Qualifier Play-off.

Squads

Fixtures

References

External links
 Series home at ESPN Cricinfo

International cricket competitions in Malaysia
International cricket competitions in 2022–23

Malaysia Cricket World Cup Challenge League A
Malaysia Cricket World Cup Challenge League A